The 1869 Cachar earthquake occurred on 10 January with an estimated moment magnitude of 7.4 and a maximum EMS-98 intensity of VII (Damaging). Two people were killed and damage was considered severe. The earthquake was felt in Upper Burma, Bihar, Jharkhand, Bengal and Northeast India.

Earthquake

See also
List of historical earthquakes
List of earthquakes in India

References

Further reading

Earthquakes in India
January 1869 events
1869 earthquakes
1869 disasters in India